Nali Shumali , is a village and one of the 51 Union Councils (administrative subdivisions) of Khushab District in the Punjab Province of Pakistan.  It is located at 32°29'17N 72°19'26E

Nali Shumali is one of the largest and most populous villages of district Khushab, with a population of 30,000.  There are many mines of coal silica and other minerals, but its main problem is the drinking water. This village is dominated by Awan tribe. The main clans are Sangal, Dalyal, Siwal, Chotyal, and Kandan. A famous Sufi saint, Mian  Muhammad Azeem Bundi, lies  buried here.

References

    3.Riaz Ul awaisia , book published by

Sahibzada Shah Sultan. 

Union councils of Khushab District
Populated places in Khushab District